Irène Zilahy (born Irén Mária Gajdzinszky 10 August 1904  – 4 April 1944) was a Hungarian actress. She was born in Kaposvár, Hungary and died during the Siege of Budapest. She appeared in both Hungarian and French films during her career.

Selected filmography
 Paprika (1933)
 Tovaritch (1935)
 Csardas (1935)
 Lady Seeks a Room (1937)

References

External links

1904 births
1944 deaths
Hungarian film actresses
People from Kaposvár
20th-century Hungarian actresses
Hungarian civilians killed in World War II
Deaths by airstrike during World War II